Henry Galbraith was an Irish Anglican priest:

Galbraith was born in County Galway and educated at Trinity College, Dublin. Galbraith was ordained in 1851. After curacies in Loughgall and Dublin he held incumbencies at Rathdrum and Powerscourt.  He was Archdeacon of Glendalough from 1888 until 1905.

References

Alumni of Trinity College Dublin
Archdeacons of Glendalough
19th-century Irish Anglican priests
20th-century Irish Anglican priests
1905 deaths
1827 births
People from County Galway